Vera Valentina Benrós de Melo Duarte Lobo de Pina (born October 2, 1952), also known as Vera Duarte Martins, is a Cape Verdean human rights activist, government minister and politician.

Biography
Duarte was born in Mindelo on the island of São Vicente.  She spent her first years of school in Cape Verde.  She studied abroad in Portugal at the University of Lisbon.

She returned to Praia in Cape Verde and became a counsellor judge at the Supreme Court.  She later became an advisor to the President of the Republic.

Duarte was the recipient of the inaugural North–South Prize in 1995, along with musician, Peter Gabriel. The North–South Prize is awarded annually to recipients in the field of human rights by the North–South Centre of the Council of Europe. She is also a founding member of the Lisbon Forum.

Duarte is the only Capeverdean to have the U Tam'si Prize for African Poetry won in 2001.

Duarte co-founded and chaired the National Commission for Human Rights and Citizenship of Cape Verde in 2003. Most recently, Duarte has served as the Cape Verdean Minister of Education.

Works

Poems
 1993 – Amanhã amadrugada
 2001 – O arquipélago da paixão
 2005 – Preces e súplicas ou os cânticos da desesperança
 2010 – Exercícios poéticos

Novels
 2003 – A candidata (The Candidate)

Essays
 2007 – Construindo a utopia (Constructing Utopias)

References

Cape Verdean human rights activists
Government ministers of Cape Verde
Cape Verdean poets
1952 births
Living people
Cape Verdean women writers
People from Mindelo
Cape Verdean women poets
Cape Verdean novelists
Women novelists
20th-century poets
21st-century poets
21st-century novelists
Women essayists
21st-century essayists
20th-century women writers
21st-century women writers
21st-century judges
21st-century women politicians
Women government ministers of Cape Verde